The lesser palatine arteries are arteries of the head. It is a branch of the descending palatine artery. They supply the palatine tonsils and the soft palate.

Structure 
The lesser palatine arteries are branches of the descending palatine artery. They go through the lesser palatine foramina. They anastomose with the ascending pharyngeal artery.

Function 
The lesser palatine arteries give off tonsillary branches to supply the palatine tonsils. They also gives off mucosal branches that usually supply the soft palate, and potentially the hard palate.

See also 
 Lesser palatine nerve

References 

Arteries of the head and neck